Venus is the Roman goddess of love. 

Notable people with the given name include:

People
 Venus Faiq (born 1963), Iraqi-Kurdish and Dutch writer, poet, translator, editor, and journalist
 Venus Lacy (born 1967), American former Olympic and professional basketball player
 Venus Raj (born 1988), Miss Universe Philippines 2010
 Venus Ramey (1924–2017), Miss America in 1944
 Venus Terzo (born 1967), Canadian actress
 Venus Williams (born 1980), American professional tennis player

Fictional characters
 Venus (Tannhäuser opera), leading role in Wagner's opera
 Venus (Marvel Comics), two Marvel Comics characters
 Venus (Teenage Mutant Ninja Turtles), the short-lived sister of the Teenage Mutant Ninja Turtles
 Venus Smith, an early associate of John Steed in The Avengers (TV series)
 Venus Bluegenes, in the British comic 2000 AD and in comic strips
 Kasuga, the female ninja in the Uesugi clan in Devil Kings whose Devil Kings' name is Venus
 Venus, a glamorous doctor of French origin on the television show Fireball XL5
 Venus, the female protagonist in the PSP video game Metal Gear Acid 2
 Venus, a character from the Nintendo video game Earthbound
 Venus, one of the three main characters from We Know the Devil
 Venus McFlytrap, the daughter of the Venus flytrap, from Monster High
 Sailor Venus or Minako Aino, a character from Sailor Moon

Feminine given names
English feminine given names 
Greek feminine given names
Latin feminine given names